Emeline Bachelder Gurney (1816–1897) was a woman from Fayette, Maine, who was shunned by her family and community. Emeline gained notoriety after death, with her life story inspiring a book and a play.

Folklore 
Emeline's story was recorded by Nettie Mitchell, a lifelong resident of Fayette, in a documentary directed by David Hoffman. Mitchell claimed that Emeline was sent to work in Lowell, Massachusetts, when she was fourteen to help support her family. There she was impregnated by the factory owner's son. Emeline confided in her aunt and uncle, who found a couple who agreed to adopt her child after it was born. The couple supported Emeline financially throughout her pregnancy and paid for her to be brought back to Fayette. Years after she returned, she married a younger man who worked for the railroad and had gone to Fayette for work. The pair fell in love and married shortly after meeting. When the man's parents came to visit the couple, they soon discovered that Emeline was his biological mother. The man was forced by his family to abandon Emeline, who was shunned by her community due to her illegitimate child and her incestuous marriage. Years later, Emeline died alone in her home from starvation and was given a simple funeral. According to  Nettie Mitchell, at Emeline's funeral, "her sister went to the casket, and placing her hand upon it, and her other hand high in the air, she said, 'At last she has paid for her sin.' That was [. . .] the climax of the tragedy. And my mother came home so upset and so angry. And really, my mother, although she was a very mild person, said, 'I think her sister sinned more than she.'” The town's residents refused to bury her in nearby Moose Hill Cemetery so her body lies in an unmarked grave under a nearby road.

Life & death 
Emeline was born on January 30, 1816, the fourth child of Aaron and Sophia (née Gould) Bachelder. She had three older siblings, Henrietta (1810–1886), David Stephen (1811–1882), and Lucy (1814–1816), and a younger sister, Hannah (1818–1908). The family was impoverished and struggled to financially support their children. There is no evidence of Emeline ever living in Lowell. Her only connection to the area was her brother David, who lived there with his wife and children. Emeline married George Chamberlain and the marriage produced a son, Gustav Chamberlain (1844-1901). It's unknown how many years the couple lived together, as George eventually abandoned Emeline and left her destitute. Emeline later married Leonard Bolles Gurney, on April 16, 1878. Despite the rumors of Emeline marrying her son this could not have been true because both of her husbands were also older than her and there's no evidence she was related to them. Emeline, widowed after Leonard's death, died from dysentery on October 9, 1897.

Representation in media 

 The book Emmeline, written by Judith Rossner, is a fictionalized account of her life.
 The opera Emmeline, composed by Tobias Picker, is based on Judith Rossner's book.

Citations 

People from Maine
1897 deaths
1816 births